GZP may refer to:
 Gazipaşa Airport, in the Antalya Province, Turkey
 Gazpromavia, a Russian airline
 Gezi Party, a Turkish political party